Trichaltica is a genus of flea beetles in the family Chrysomelidae. There are some 30 described species, found in North America and the Neotropics.

Selected species
 Trichaltica scabricula (Crotch, 1873)
 Trichaltica tibialis (Jacoby, 1892)
 Trichaltica virescens Schaeffer
 Trichaltica xantholimbia (Bechyné)

References

Further reading

 

Alticini
Chrysomelidae genera
Articles created by Qbugbot
Taxa named by Edgar von Harold